Padmadalakshan, better known by his stage name Kuthiravattam Pappu (24 December 1936 – 25 February 2000), was a popular Indian stage and film actor. His repertoire of acting was based on his unique style and use of the Kozhikodan dialect, impeccable timing and the capability to grasp the subtle nuances of any character and mould it into his signature "Pappu style". He acted in over a thousand Malayalam films. He made his debut in a small comic role in Bhargavi Nilayam. His character was called ‘Kuthiravattom,’ a name that stuck for the rest of his career.

Early life 

Pappu was born as Padmadalakshan in Feroke near Calicut (Kozhikode), Kerala, as the son of Panaghat Raman and Devi. The family moved to the village of Kuthiravattam (Half a kilometre from Govindapuram, Calicut) when Pappu was still a child.  He was keen in acting since childhood and performed his first major stage performance when he was 17. At that time he was studying in St. Antony's School, Calicut.

Family
He was married to Padmini. The couple have three children, Bindu, Biju and Binu. Binu Pappu is an actor in Malayalam movies.

Career 

Pappu started his career as a drama artist. He acted in about thousand instant plays and two professional dramas, Samasya and Manasu. His role in the drama Samasya fetched him the Best Comedian Award.

Pappu has worked with Kunjandi, Nellikode Bhaskaran, Thikkodiyan and K. T. Muhammed. Film personalities Ramu Karyat and A. Vincent were impressed by his performance in Mudiyanaya Puthran and gave him chance to act in the film Moodupadam. His first noted role was in Bhargavi Nilayam, written by Vaikom Muhammad Basheer and directed by A. Vincent. The name of his character in the film given by Vaikom Muhammad Basheer, "Kuthiravattam Pappu" stayed with him for the rest of his life.

His performance in Angadi, Ahimsa, Karimbana, Eenadu, Moorkhan, Aalkkoottathil Thaniye, Itha Oru Theeram, Kanakkinavu was remarkable. The turning point in his career was his roles in Chembarathi, Avalude Ravukal, Angaadi. Even his brief roles like those in Manichitrathazhu and The King are well remembered till this day. His one-liners like "Taski Viliyeda" in Thenmavin Kombath and "Ippo Sariyakkitharam" and "'Thamaraseri Churam'" in Vellanakalude Nadu earned their position in the list of Malayalam idioms. His first reference about Thamarassery churam was in the movie T P Balagopalan M A.

Pappu became one of the best comedians Malayalam cinema has ever seen. He used Kozhikode slang in his acting which was well liked and appreciated. Due to his affection toward plays, with the help of his old friends in the field of theatre, he founded Akshara Theatres a few weeks before his death. 
He died in a private hospital in Calicut following a cardiac arrest on 25 February 2000.

Partial filmography

Malayalam

 Ammaye Kaanaan (1963) as Pamman
 Aadyakiranangal (1964)
 Thacholi Othenan (1964) as Ramar
 Bhargavi Nilayam (1964) as Kuthiravattam Pappu
 Kuttyedathi (1971) as Kuttishankaran
 Chembarathi (1972) as Kuttan 
 Panimudakku (1972) as Yashodharan
 Nirmalyam (1973)
 Kaapalika (1973) as Ithakku
 Mazhakkaru (1973) as Maniyan
 Criminals (Kayangal) (1975)
 Cheenavala (1975) as Fernandez
 Penpada (1975) as Janaki(Transvestite)
 Sathyathinte Nizhalil (1975) 
Chattambikkalyaani (1975) as Kochappan
 Ulsavam(1975) as Paramu
 Hridhayam Oru Kshethram (1976) as Nanu
 Madhuram Thirumaduram (1976)
 Thulavarsham (1976) as Chenkeeri
 Kamadhenu (1976) as Kunjiraman
 Aalinganam (1976) as Peethambharan
 Guruvayoor Kesavan (1977) 
Vidarunna Mottukal (1977) as Madhupan
 Shankupushppam (1977) as Rajesh
 Angeekaram (1977) as Neelambharan
 Oonjal (1977) as Sankaran
 Avalude Ravukal (1978) 
 Eeta (1978) as Paramu
 Lisa (1978) as Gopalan 
 Arum Anyaralla (1978) as Bhargavan
 Itha Oru Manushyan (1978) as Bharathan
 Ee Manohara Theeram (1978) as Appukuttan
Kaathirunna Nimisham (1978) as Harischandran Nair
 Angakkuri (1979)
 Kayalum Kayarum (1979) 
 Maamaankam (1979)
 Neelathamara (1979) as Kuttishankara Menon
 Jeevitham Oru Gaanam (1979) as Zachariah/Rappel (double role)
 Itha Oru Theeram (1979) as Chellappan
 Agnivyuham (1979) as Appu
Sugathinu Pinnale (1979) as Kunjuvareed
 Anupallavi (1979) as Sundaran
Ivide Kattinu Sugandam (1979) as Pushkaran
 Ambalavilakku (1979) as Lonachan
 Manasa Vacha Karmana (1979) 
 Moorkhan (1980) as Kuttappan
 Swantham Enna Padam (1980) as Manmadan
 Karimpana (1980) as Palayyan
 Chaakara (1980) as Kuttan Pillai
 Sathyam (1980) as Sankaran 
 Angaadi (1980) as Abu
 Benz Vasu (1980) as Pappu
 Theekkadal (1980) as Pappan
 Aswaratham (1980) as Velayyan
 Meen (1980) as Pappy
 Prakadanam (1980) as Kamalahasanan
 Rajaneegandhi (1980) as
Raagam Thaanam Pallavi (1980) as Gopalankutty
 Mr Michael (1980) as Pappu
 Kaavalmaadam (1980) as Kunjali
 Arikkari Ammu (1981)
 Attimari (1981) as Salim, Hameed
 Sphodanam (1981) as Narayana Pilla
 Ahimsa as Muthu
 Dwanthayudham (1981)
 Vayal (1981) as Sankunni
 Kaahalam (1981)
 Greeshmajwaala (1981) as Chothi
 Kodumudikal (1981) as Nanappan
 Asthamikkatha Pakalukal (1981) as Gopalan
 Poochasanyasi (1981) 
 Ee Nadu (1982) as Khader
 Mattuvin Chattangale (1982)
 Thadakam (1982)
 Postmortem (1982)
 Veedu (1982) as Prabhakaran
 Sindoora Sandhyakku Mounam (1982) as Chandran
 Pooviriyum Pulari (1982) as Nanu
 John Jaffer Janardhanan (1982) as Charlie
 Innalenkil Nale (1982)
 Anuraagakkodathi(1982) as Gopi
 Varanmare Avashyamundu(1982) 
 Hello Madras Girl (1983)
 Eettappuli (1983) as Pappan
 Mortuary (1983) as Gopalan
 Thavalam (1983) as Thommi
 Thimingalam (1983)
 Aadhipathyam (1983) as Kunjiraman
 Enne Njan Thedunnu (1983) as Unni
 Belt Mathai (1983) as Pachu Pillai
 Thathamme Poocha Poocha (1984) as Ananthan
 Poochakkoru Mookkuthi (1984) as Kuttan
 Mainakam (1984) as Vasu
 Shabadham (1984) as Kunjan Nair
 Aalkoottathil Thaniye (1984) as Kuttikrishnan 
 Onnum Mindatha Bharya (1984) as Bapputti
 Appunni (1984) as Karunakaran
 Adiyozhukkukal (1984) as Sivan Kutti
 Rakshassu (1984) as Mammad
Theere Pratheekshikkathe(1984) as Achu
Kodathi (1984) as Antonym
 Odaruthammava Aalariyam (1984) as Pachu Pillai

 Parayanumvayya Parayathirikkanumvayya (1985) as Raman
 Mutharamkunnu P.O. (1985) as K. P. K. Thankappan
 Kaiyum Thalayum Purathidaruthu (1985) as Appu
 Jeevante Jeevan (1985) as Peter
 Angadikkappurathu (1985) as Pappu
 Ottayan (1985) as Korappan
 Shatru (1985) as Kurup
 Idanilangal (1985) as Swami Pilla
 Pachavelicham (1985)
 Chorakku Chora (1985) as Velu
 Mukhyamanthri (1985) as Kuttappan
 Principal Olivil (1985) 
 Vartha (1986) 
 Vivahithare Ithile (1986)
 T. P. Balagopalan M.A. (1986) as Chandrankutty
 Ayalvasi Oru Daridravasi (1986) as Velu
 Mazha Peyyunnu Maddalam Kottunnu (1986) as Koma Kurup
 Annoru Ravil (1986) as Antony Nair
 Nandi Veendum Varika (1986) as Mukundan
 Karinagam (1986)
 Nakhakshathangal (1986)
 Ithramathram (1986) as Pappan
 Naradhan Keralathil (1987) as Police Constable
 Ithrayum Kalam (1987) as Sankunni Nair 
 Janangalude Sradhakku (1987) as Balan
 Amrutham Gamaya (1987) as Kumaran
 Vellanakalude Nadu (1988) as Sulaiman
 Anuragi (1988) as Kunjappan
 Aryan (1988) 
 Kanakambarangal (1988) as Nanappan
 Oru Muthassi Katha (1988) as Koyammedkka
 Mukunthetta Sumitra Vilikkunnu (1988) as Aussapachen
 Loose Loose Arappiri Loose (1988) as Pappu
 Janmandharam (1988) as Kuruppilli Kuriakose
 Abkari (1988) as Kumaran
 1921 (1988)
 Annakutty Kodambakkam Vilikkunnu (1989) as Mathai
 Ulsavapittennu (1989) as Pushpangadan
 Peruvannapurathe Visheshangal (1989) as Pushpangadan
 Naduvazhikal (1989) as K. C.
 Mahayanam (1989) as Kunjappan
 Vandhanam (1989) 
 V.I.P. (1989) as Khaderkutty
 Aazhikkoru Muthu (1989) as Kuttan Pilla
 Pradeshika Varthakal (1989) as Velichappadu
 Saandhram (1990) as Caesar
 Nagarangalil Chennu Raparkam (1990)
 Dr. Pasupathy (1990) as Uthpalakshan
 Aye Auto (1990) as Moidu
 Nammude Nadu (1990) as Musthafa
 Midhya (1990) as Ezhuthachan
 Oliyampukal (1990) as Thankan
 Anaswaram (1991) as Tool/Ambady Ramakrishnan
 Amina Tailors (1991) as Kunjalavi
 Pookkalam Varavayi (1991) as Mariyappan
 Parallel College (1991) as Sanathan Pillai
 Kadinjool Kalyanam (1991) as Mathai
 Georgekutty C/O Georgekutty (1991) as Paulose
 Advaitham (1991) as Kaiyathan
 Amaram (1991) as Raman Kutty
 Eagle (1991) as Azeez
 Mookkillarajyathu (1991) as Vasu/Sundaran Pillai
 Neelagiri (1991) as Arumukhan
 Utsava Melam (1992)
 Radhachakram (1992) as Ponnan
 Kizhakkan Pathrose (1992) as Devassia/Marangodan (nickname)
 Naadody (1992) as Kutty
 Johnnie Walker (1992)
 Vietnam Colony (1993) as Erumeli
 Midhunam (1993) as Palisha Peethambaran
 Manichithrathazhu (1993) as Kattuparamban
 Ekalavyan (1993) as Govindan Kutty
 Customs Diary (1993) as Vishwanathan
 Akashadoothu (1993) as Chandy
 Arthana (1993)
 Aayirappara (1993)
 Pingami (1994) as Achuthan
 Thenmavin Kombathu (1994) as Ammavan
 Chakoram (1994) as Ammama
 Chukkan (1994) as Beeranikka
 Gamanam (1994) as Kunjiraman 
 Nirnayam (1995) as Servant
 Kakkakum Poochakkum Kalyanam (1995) 
 Vrudhanmare Sookshikkuka (1995) as Sundaresan Nair
 Tom & Jerry (1995) as Kesava Kaimal
 Thovalapookkal (1995)
 Kokkarakko (1995)
 Thirumanassu(1995) as Raman
 Highway (1995) as Rajappan
 Alancherry Thambrakkal (1995) as Kariyathen
 Kidilol Kidilam (1995) as Hassan
 Kaattile Thadi Thevarude Ana (1995) as Veerappan
 The King (1995) as Krishnan
 Thooval Kottaram (1996) as Kunjuraman Menon
 Mr. Clean (1996) as Bhargavan Pillai
 Madamma (1996) as Politician
 Hitlist (1996) as Sankar Das
 Sugavaasam (1996) as Venkidi
 Kalyana Unnikal (1997) as Kuttappi
 Kalyanappittannu (1997)
 Hitler Brothers (1997) as Nanappan
 Ekkareyanente Manasam (1997) as Sumathi's Uncle
 Chandralekha (1997) as Accountant
 Aaraam Thampuran (1997) as Mangalam
 Sundarakilladi (1998)
 Oro Viliyum Kathorthu (1998) as Achuthan
 Mayajalam (1998) as Paramanandan Nair
 Magician Mahendralal from Delhi (1998) as Sivan Pillai
 Pallavur Devanarayanan (1999) as Kunjuraman
 Chandranudikkunna Dikkil (1999)
 Veendum Chila Veettukaryangal (1999)
 Mr. Butler (2000) (posthumously)
 Narasimham (2000)
 Njan Rajavu (2002) (Posthumously)

Series 
Akashadoothu 
Chirikkam Namukku Chirikkam

References

External links

Pappu's profile at weblokam.com (in Malayalam)

Indian male film actors
Male actors from Kozhikode
1936 births
2000 deaths
Male actors in Malayalam cinema
20th-century Indian male actors
Male actors in Malayalam television
Indian male television actors
Indian male stage actors
Male actors in Malayalam theatre